The Black Sabbath Motorcycle Club Nation is a national Motorcycle Club whose members ride all makes of street legal motorcycles (cruisers at least 750cc and sport bikes at least 600cc). , it is not listed by the United States Department of Justice or California Department of Justice as an Outlaw Motorcycle Club or Gang.

Mission

References

External links 
 

Motorcycle clubs in the United States
1974 establishments in California